Kukačky is  a Czech family comedy-drama series developed and produced by Dramedy Productions for Czech Television. It began broadcasting on 8 January 2021 on ČT1. It focuses Jakub and Tomáš, children who got swapped in hospital.

The last episode of the first season premiered on 2 April 2021. Season 1 was very successful with average rating 1.7 million viewers over the age of 15 with a share of 36.50%.

In March 2021, ČT program director Milan Fridrich confirmed the planned preparations for the continuation of the series; in early July 2022, at the Karlovy Vary Film Festival, ČT announced that filming of the second season was already underway (again under the direction of Biser A. Arichtev) and revealed that by new characters will be added to the plot while Holec and Kadlec families will live opposite each other. The second series of Cuckoos with thirteen parts, presented on 11 January 2023 in the Municipal Library of Prague, was broadcast by Czech Television on 20 January of the same year.

Cast

Kadlec and Býček family
Viktor Sekanina as Jakub Kadlec
Marek Adamczyk as Martin Kadlec, Jakub's father
Marta Dancingerová as Tereza Kadlecová (née Býčková), Jakub's mother
Jiří Štrébl as Libor Kadlec, Martin's father
Veronika Freimanová as Klára Kadlecová, Martin's mother
Luboš Veselý as Rudolf Býček, Tereza's father
Petr Kostka as Vladimír Býček, Rudolf's father, Tereza's grandafther Terezy
Libuše Švormová as Jindřiška Býčková, Rudolf's father mother, Tereza's grandmother

Holec family
Theo Schaefer as Tomáš Holec
David Novotný as Karel Holec, Tomáš' father
Sabina Remundová as Olga Holcová, Tomáš' mother
Darija Pavlovičová as Bára Holcová, Karel and Olga's daughter
Denisa Barešová as Marcela Holcová, Karel and Olga's daughter
Michal Isteník as David Holec, Karel's brother

Others
Klára Cibulková as MUDr. Kateřina Firstová
Jan Dolanský as MUDr. Pavel Tesař
Jitka Čvančarová / Eva Hacurová as Kamila Tesařová
Štěpán Benoni as Hynek
Adam Ernest as Luboš Richtrmoc
Filip Čapka as Josef Máca
Helena Dvořáková as Květa Richtrmocová
Petr Štěpán as Dušan Richtrmoc
Adéla Petřeková as Jana
Vilém Udatný as Libor Nerad
Ondřej Kraus as Ondřej Fuchs
Anette Nesvadbová as Petra Fuchsová
David Máj as kpt. Zdeněk Remeš
Natálie Řehořová as Mgr. Lenka Malá
Andrea Daňková as Veronika
Lucie Žáčková as Veronika
Antonio Šoposki as Marek Richter
Zdeněk Julina as MUDr. Jan Vostrčil
Daniel Svoboda as Josef Pádivý

Episodes

References

External links

2020s Czech television series
Czech comedy television series
Czech drama television series
2021 Czech television series debuts
Czech Television original programming
2023 Czech television series endings